Cornelius may refer to:

People
 Cornelius (name), Roman family name and a masculine given name
 Pope Cornelius, pope from AD 251 to 253
 St. Cornelius (disambiguation), multiple saints
 Cornelius (musician), stage name of Keigo Oyamada
 Metropolitan Cornelius (disambiguation), several people
 Cornelius the Centurion, Roman centurion considered by Christians to be the first Gentile to convert to the Christian faith

Places in the United States
 Cornelius, Indiana
 Cornelius, Kentucky
 Cornelius, North Carolina
 Cornelius, Oregon

Other uses
 Cornelius keg, a metal container originally used by the soft drink industry
 Adam E. Cornelius (ship, 1973), a lake freighter built for the American Steamship Company
 Cornelius, a play by John Boynton Priestley

See also

 
 
 Cornelius House (disambiguation)
 Cornelia (disambiguation)
 Corneliu (disambiguation)
 Cornelis (disambiguation)